Flash Brown (born January 17, 1981) is the stage name of an American pornographic actor, model, and former professional basketball player. In 2010, he received the Urban X Award for Best Male Newcomer.

Early life
Brown was born in Memphis, Tennessee. He played basketball in high school and for the Amateur Athletic Union. He was a college basketball player and he holds a degree in General Education. He also played professionally in Ireland and China and semi-professionally in Birmingham, Alabama and Nashville and Memphis in Tennessee.

Career
Brown was working as a model when a photographer suggested he do porn. Prior to working in the adult film industry, he was nicknamed "Flash" in college for his speed as a basketball player. "Brown" is a shortened version of his real last name. He entered the adult film industry in November 2009. In April 2011, he partnered with Shinefish Films and launched his own pornographic film studio, Flash Brown Productions. In February 2015, he signed an exclusive performing contract with Blacked.com.

On January 28, 2019 adult film site Mikesouth.com reported that Brown had been arrested on charges of domestic violence human trafficking assault with a deadly weapon. He was released from prison on October 26, 2020 and ordered to serve 5 years of probation

Awards and nominations

References

External links

 
 
 
 

1981 births
African-American pornographic film actors
American male pornographic film actors
Living people
Male actors from Memphis, Tennessee
Pornographic film actors from Tennessee
Male models from Tennessee
21st-century African-American people
20th-century African-American people